Vitaliy Balashov (born 15 January 1991) is a Ukrainian professional footballer who plays as a forward for Kazakh side Aktobe.

Career
He is a product of the Chornomorets Odesa Youth academy and has played for both the reserve squad and youth squad.

In 2016, he played for Wisła Kraków in the Polish Ekstraklasa.

On 4 August 2020, he signed a two-year contract with Russian Premier League club FC Tambov. His Tambov contract was terminated on 9 October.

On 2 March 2021, he signed a contract with Kazakhstan Premier League club FC Shakhter Karagandy, but his contract was terminated just three months later.

References

External links 
Profile on Official Website (Ukr)

Profile at FFU Official Site (Ukr)

1991 births
Living people
Footballers from Odesa
Ukrainian footballers
Association football forwards
Ukrainian expatriate footballers
Expatriate footballers in Poland
Expatriate footballers in Moldova
Expatriate footballers in Belarus
Expatriate footballers in Russia
Expatriate footballers in Kazakhstan
Ukrainian expatriate sportspeople in Poland
Ukrainian expatriate sportspeople in Moldova
Ukrainian expatriate sportspeople in Belarus
Ukrainian expatriate sportspeople in Russia
Ukrainian expatriate sportspeople in Kazakhstan
Ekstraklasa players
Ukrainian Premier League players
Russian Premier League players
Kazakhstan Premier League players
FC Chornomorets Odesa players
FC Hoverla Uzhhorod players
FC Chornomorets-2 Odesa players
Wisła Kraków players
FC Milsami Orhei players
FC Isloch Minsk Raion players
FC Olimpik Donetsk players
FC Tambov players
FC Shakhter Karagandy players
FC Aktobe players
Ukraine youth international footballers
Ukraine under-21 international footballers